"Bad Boy" is a song by South Korean singer Chungha and Danish singer Christopher. It was released on September 23, 2020, by MNH Entertainment, Parlophone Denmark and Warner Music Korea.

Background
The artists' first collaboration work was originally planned to showcase during Christopher's concert in Korea this year, which was canceled due to the coronavirus pandemic.

Christopher, known for his love for Korea and K-pop, brought up the idea of working with a K-pop star for his concert.

MNH Entertainment said that Warner Music Korea offered Chungha the idea, and she gladly accepted it because she had been a fan of Christopher's music.

Composition and lyrics
"Bad Boy" was written by Park Sung-jin, Kim Jae-woong, Park Ki-hyun and Anna Timgren. It runs for three minutes and three seconds. The upbeat track talks about a man who would want to be a "bad boy" to win her back ― is woven through with the artists' smooth vocals.

Commercial performance
The song topped the chart on Bugs music, and was second on Genie Music's chart, one day after the release.

Music video
The music video was released on September 28, 2020.

Awards and nominations

Charts

Release history

References

2020 songs
2020 singles
Christopher (singer) songs
Chungha songs
MNH Entertainment singles
Warner Music Group singles
Parlophone singles
English-language South Korean songs